The Artesia Daily Press is a newspaper in Artesia, New Mexico, United States.

References

External links
Official website

Newspapers published in New Mexico